Comata, the Sioux is a 1909 silent short Western film directed by D. W. Griffith. It was produced and released by the American Mutoscope and Biograph Company.

Cast
 James Kirkwood as Comata, the Sioux
 Marion Leonard as Clear Eyes
 Arthur V. Johnson as Bud Watkins
 Linda Arvidson as Nellie Howe
 Verner Clarges as Father/Indian Chief

See also
 D. W. Griffith filmography

References

External links
 
 Comata, the Sioux (Youtube)

1909 films
1909 Western (genre) films
American black-and-white films
American silent short films
Biograph Company films
Films directed by D. W. Griffith
Silent American Western (genre) films
1900s American films